Nu Rho Psi ( or NRP) is the National Honor Society in Neuroscience, founded in 2006 by the Faculty for Undergraduate Neuroscience and now an independent honor society. Nu Rho Psi is a non-profit, grass-roots organization of neuroscientists and is governed by a National Council elected by the members. Charters have been awarded to chapters at colleges and universities in all regions of the United States of America. As of November 2021 Nu Rho Psi has installed 98+ chapters and initiated 7,000+ lifetime members. Prominent honorary members include Dr. Larry Squire (University of California – San Diego), Dr. Robert Sapolsky (Stanford University), Bruce McEwen (Rockefeller University) and the 14th Dalai Lama of Tibet.

Nu Rho Psi is a tax-exempt 501(c)(3) public charity incorporated in the state of Ohio, US. The society has a small part-time staff housed at Baldwin Wallace University (Berea, Ohio, US) and is managed by a member-elected national council consisting of student and faculty volunteers from many colleges and universities throughout the United States.

Mission, Greek letter designation, and insignia 

The official mission and purpose of Nu Rho Psi is to: (1) encourage professional interest and excellence in scholarship, particularly in neuroscience; (2) award recognition to students who have achieved such excellence in scholarship; (3) advance the discipline of neuroscience; (4) encourage intellectual and social interaction between students, faculty, and professionals in neuroscience and related fields; (5) promote career development in neuroscience and related fields; (6) increase public awareness of neuroscience and its benefits for the individual and society; and, (7) encourage service to the community.

The Greek letters of the honor society, “ΝΡΨ”, designates the interdisciplinary science that engages its members in the study of the brain and the rest of the nervous system. The Greek letter Nu (Ν, ν) stands for the noun Nous (pronounced “noose”), meaning “Mind”. The letter Rho (Ρ, ρ) stands for the verb Ρueaoai (pronounced “hruesthigh”) meaning, “to cure”. The letter Psi (Ψ, ψ) stands for the noun Psyche (pronounced “”), meaning “life.”

History 

Nu Rho Psi, the National Honor Society in Neuroscience, was founded in 2006, but its history can be traced to the early 1990s with the founding of the Faculty for Undergraduate Neuroscience (FUN). In its formative years, Nu Rho Psi was governed by the FUN Council but, as the society grew, FUN decided that Nu Rho Psi would be better served by its own separate council. In 2006 Nu Rho Psi became an independent tax-exempt [501(c)(3)] public charity incorporated in the state of Ohio, US. The first Nu Rho Psi National Council was elected in 2011. The first charters were awarded in 2006 to Baldwin Wallace University (application dated 16 Jun 2006), Baylor University (application dated 6 Nov 2006) and Macalester College (application dated 8 Dec 2006). A full history of Nu Rho Psi can be found for download, here.

Membership requirements 

Membership is by invitation and is open to undergraduate and graduate students who are making the study of neuroscience one of their major interests and who meet the other academic qualifications. Nu Rho Psi is also open to qualifying neuroscience faculty and alumni of neuroscience programs.  Requirements for membership include:
 Major, minor, other emphasis in neuroscience
 Completion of at least 3 semesters of the college course
 Completion of at least 9 semester hours of neuroscience-related courses
 Undergraduate cumulative GPA of 3.2 and a minimum GPA of 3.5 in neuroscience courses

The National Council of Nu Rho Psi awards charters to colleges and universities in the United States that have qualified based on their neuroscience curriculum, faculty expertise, and student research opportunities – among other factors. Students and faculty are elected to membership by the chapter at participating institutions, according to the provisions in the national Nu Rho Psi Constitution and locally adopted by-laws. Any chapter, at its discretion, may establish higher academic standards for eligibility, but may not require lower standards for eligibility.  Membership in Nu Rho Psi is open to qualified candidates regardless of age, sex, sexual orientation, race handicap or disability, color, religion, or national or ethnic origin.

The current one-time membership induction fee is $40.00 for students and $50.00 for faculty. At the discretion of individual chapters, there may be additional chapter dues which are determined at the local level. No further fees go to the national organization as membership is for life.

Membership benefits 

Nu Rho Psi membership provides recognition of verified academic excellence in the interdisciplinary field of neuroscience. Students who become members of Nu Rho Psi are selected based on their superior scholarly accomplishments as well as their excellent work in the laboratory. Nu Rho Psi membership is for life and it is often a springboard for the networking and collaboration of like-minded colleagues throughout the U.S.A. interested in the study of the brain. Nu Rho Psi members are provided opportunities to form professional relationships that carry them through their careers in neuroscience. There are both regional and national Nu Rho Psi meetings where young neuroscientists from around the United States gather to share scientific findings. Nu Rho Psi offers competitive travel awards for members to attend and present their research at the annual Society for Neuroscience meeting. Nu Rho Psi also offers competitive small grants to facilitate member's senior theses or summer research projects. Nu Rho Psi mentors members through publications (e.g. The Nu Rho Psi Guide to Graduate School in Neuroscience ) and other outreach activities of the society. News and additional information about benefits are available to members via the Nu Rho Psi online newsletter. Members receive membership certificates and lapel pins as an indication of the honor they have earned.

Activities and regional/national meetings 

As documented in the Nu Rho Psi News, individual Nu Rho Psi chapters organize a variety of service and educational activities throughout the year. Regional Vice-Presidents provide leadership of the federation of chapters in the region where they reside and represent their region through service on the national council. They are also responsible for promoting Nu Rho Psi activities during the regional undergraduate neuroscience meetings (e.g. mGluRs, NEURON, SYNAPSE, MIDBRAINS). Nu Rho Psi holds an annual National Membership meeting during the Society for Neuroscience conference.

In 2014 the national council established an annual theme for its chapters. Nu Rho Psi chapters use this theme as a focal point in planning educational and service activities for the academic year.

List of current chapters 
Nu Rho Psi chapters are divided into four regional areas in the United States (Northeast, Midwest, South, and West), each with their own representative vice-president.
 Agnes Scott College
 Atlanta University Center Consortium (Morehouse College, Spelman College, Clark Atlanta University, and Morehouse School of Medicine)
 Baldwin Wallace University
 Baylor University
 Binghamton University
 Boston College
 Boston University
 Bradley University
 Carnegie Mellon University
 Carthage College
 Centenary College of Louisiana
 Central Michigan University
 Centre College
 Christopher Newport University
 College of Wooster
 Colorado State University
 Concordia College
 Connecticut College
 Denison University
 DePaul University
 Dominican University
 Drake University
 Drew University
 Emory University
 Florida State University
 Florida International University
 George Washington University
 Georgia State University
 Gustavus Adolphus College
 Johns Hopkins University
 Knox College
 Lake Forest College
 Loras College
 Loyola University Chicago
 Macalester College
 Miami University
 Millsaps College
 North Central College
 Northeastern University
 Oberlin College
 Ohio State University
 Pioneer Valley (Smith College; University of Massachusetts, Amherst)
 Regis University
 Rhodes College
 Rutgers University
 Skidmore College
 St. Mary's College of Maryland
 St. Olaf College
 Stonehill College
 Susquehanna University
 Syracuse University
 Temple University
 Thiel College
 Transylvania University
 Trinity College - Connecticut
 Tulane University
 Union College
 University of Arizona
 University of California - Irvine
 University of Cincinnati
 University of Colorado Boulder
 University of Delaware
 University of Evansville
 University of Georgia
 University of Illinois at Chicago
 University of Kansas
 University of Kentucky
 University of Massachusetts Amherst
 University of Miami
 University of Nebraska, Omaha
 University of Nevada, Reno
 University of New Hampshire
 University of Notre Dame
 University of Pennsylvania
 University of Pittsburgh
 University of Scranton
 University of Southern California
 University of St. Thomas
 University of Tennessee
 University of Virginia
 University of Vermont
 Ursinus College
 Virginia Tech
 Wartburg College
 Weber State University
 Wesleyan College

National council 

Members of the national council are elected by the Nu Rho Psi membership.
 President: Shubhik K. DebBurman, Ph.D. (γIL-1), Lake Forest College, professor of biology; chair, neuroscience program, (Term: Nov 2017 – Nov 2018; Immediate Past President: Nov 2018 – Oct 2019).
 Immediate past president: M. Jade Zee, Ph.D. (βMA-46), Northeastern University, associate director, program in behavioral neuroscience; assistant teaching professor (Term: Nov 2017 – Nov 2018).
 Secretary: Alec Calac, B.S. (αAZ-77), The University of Arizona, research fellow, National Institute of Neurological Disorders & Stroke in Bethesda, MD (Term: Nov 2017 – Nov 2019). 
 Treasurer: Beth Wee, Ph.D. (αLA-19), Tulane University, co-director of master's and undergraduate neuroscience programs; associate dean for undergraduate programs, School of Science and Engineering (SSE) and senior professor of practice in neuroscience, (Term: Nov 2016 – Nov 2018).
 Regional vice president, Northeast: Sara Lagalwar, Ph.D. (βNY-1), Skidmore College, assistant professor, neuroscience program, Williamson Chair of Neuroscience (Term: Oct 2015 – Nov 2018).
 Regional vice president, Midwest: Suzanne Sollars, Ph.D.  (αNE-15), University of Nebraska at Omaha, associate professor, program in neuroscience & behavior, Department of Psychology (Term: Nov 2016 – Oct 2019).
 Regional vice president, South: Stephanie Ross, M.S. (βGA-20), Georgia State University (Term: Nov 2017 – Nov 2020)
 Regional vice president, West: Leslie P. Tolbert, Ph.D.(αAZ-47), University of Arizona, regents’ professor in neuroscience and in cellular and molecular medicine, Dept. of Neuroscience (Term: Oct 2015 – Nov 2018).
 Social media chair: Tara M. Ellis-Vaughn, B.S. (αAZ-106), University of Arizona, neuroscience & cognitive psychology. 
 Executive director: Michael T. Kerchner, Ph.D., Washington College, Department of Psychology (Term:  Nov 2016 – Nov 2019).
 Immediate past executive director: G. Andrew Mickley, Ph.D., (αOH-1), Baldwin Wallace University, emeritus professor and founding chair, neuroscience program.

References 

 Nu Rho Psi Official Website: https://nurhopsi.org
 Ramirez, J. J., and Normansell, L. (2003) A Decade of FUN: The First Ten Years of the Faculty for Undergraduate Neuroscience. Essay for Project Kaleidoscope, Neuroscience Network. http://www.funfaculty.net/drupal/sites/funfaculty.net/files/ramirez%202003_0.pdf
 Hardwick, J.C., Kerchner, M., Lom, B.,  Ramirez, J.J. and Wiertelak, E.P. (2006) From Faculty for Undergraduate Neuroscience: Encouraging Innovation in Undergraduate Neuroscience Education by Supporting Student Research and Faculty Development. CBE: Life Sciences Education, 5: 86-90. http://www.funfaculty.org/drupal/sites/funfaculty.org/files/hardwick%202006.pdf
 Nu Rho Psi's Guide to Graduate School in Neuroscience (2013) http://www.nurhopsi.org/drupal/sites/nurhopsi.org/files/webfiles/execfiles/NRP%20Guide%20to%20Grad%20School%207_28_13_POSTED.pdf
 Midwest/Great Lakes Undergraduate Research Symposium in Neuroscience http://mglurs.org/
 NEURON Conference http://www.quinnipiac.edu/department-of-psychology/neuron-conference/
 SYNAPSE Meeting http://synapse.cofc.edu/
 MIDBRAINS Conference http://www.macalester.edu/midbrainconference/

Honor societies
Neuroscience organizations
2006 establishments in Ohio